The Firenze Tennis Cup is a professional tennis tournament played on clay courts. It is currently part of the ATP Challenger Tour. It is held annually in Florence, Italy since 2018.

Past finals

Singles

Doubles

External links
 Website

ATP Challenger Tour
Clay court tennis tournaments
Tennis tournaments in Italy
Florence
Recurring sporting events established in 2018
2018 establishments in Italy